The Penrose criterion in Plasma Physics is a criterion for kinetic stability of a plasma with a given velocity-space distribution function. This criterion can be used to determine that all so-called "single-humped" distributions (those with a single maximum), are kinetically stable.

Plasma physics